The Milwaukee Brewers' 1989 season involved the Brewers' finishing 4th in the American League East with a record of 81 wins and 81 losses. The Brewers led MLB with 165 stolen bases.

Offseason
 October 26, 1988: Steve Stanicek was released by the Brewers.
 December 20, 1988: Jim Gantner was signed as a free agent by the Brewers.
 March 30, 1989: Terry Francona was signed as a free agent by the Brewers.
March 30, 1989: Dave Engel was signed as a free agent with the Milwaukee Brewers.

Regular season
 During the season, Robin Yount had a 19-game hitting streak. Yount finished the season leading the Brewers in RBIs for the third straight season.

Notable transactions
 June 5, 1989: Jason Giambi was drafted by the Brewers in the 43rd round of the 1989 Major League Baseball draft, but did not sign.
August 2, 1989: Dave Engel was released by the Milwaukee Brewers.
 August 23, 1989: The Milwaukee Brewers traded a player to be named later to the Atlanta Braves for Ed Romero. The Brewers completed the deal by sending Jay Aldrich to the Braves on September 1.

Season standings

Record vs. opponents

First SkyDome Game
The Brewers played in the first baseball game at the SkyDome. The game was played on June 5 against the Toronto Blue Jays, and the Brewers won by a score of 5-3. Don August was the winning pitcher as he won his 5th game of the season, while Toronto's Jimmy Key lost his 4th game of the season. The attendance at SkyDome was 48,378.

Linescore
June 5, SkyDome, Toronto, Canada

Roster

Player stats

Batting

Starters by position
Note: Pos = Position; G = Games played; AB = At bats; H = Hits; Avg. = Batting average; HR = Home runs; RBI = Runs batted in

Other batters
Note: G = Games played; AB = At bats; H = Hits; Avg. = Batting average; HR = Home runs; RBI = Runs batted in

Pitching

Starting pitchers 
Note: G = Games pitched; IP = Innings pitched; W = Wins; L = Losses; ERA = Earned run average; SO = Strikeouts

Other pitchers 
Note: G = Games pitched; IP = Innings pitched; W = Wins; L = Losses; ERA = Earned run average; SO = Strikeouts

Relief pitchers 
Note: G = Games pitched; W = Wins; L = Losses; SV = Saves; ERA = Earned run average; SO = Strikeouts

Awards and honors
 Robin Yount – American League Most Valuable Player

All-Star Game
 Dan Plesac, pitcher, reserve

Farm system

The Brewers' farm system consisted of seven minor league affiliates in 1989. The Brewers operated a Dominican Summer League team as a co-op with the Boston Red Sox and Baltimore Orioles. The AZL Brewers won the Arizona League championship.

References

1989 Milwaukee Brewers team at Baseball-Reference
1989 Milwaukee Brewers at Baseball Almanac

Milwaukee Brewers seasons
Milwaukee Brewers season
Mil